In Japan, the national government issues vehicle registration plates for motor vehicles through the Ministry of Land, Infrastructure, Transport and Tourism Land Transportation Offices nationwide. However, the local municipality rather than the national government registers certain vehicles with small engine displacements.

The number on the top line is a vehicle class code which begins with a 0 through 9 to indicate specific vehicle classification. This is signified by the length, width and height of the vehicle as well as engine displacement.

Official vehicles of the Imperial household are exempt from the requirement to display such plates. Official vehicles of the Self-Defense Forces and the foreign diplomats are required to display other plates. 

The plates are installed on both the front and rear of the vehicle, with the rear plate permanently attached to the vehicle with a prefecture seal completely covering one of the attaching plate bolts. The plate is only removed when the vehicle is sold secondhand to someone from a different prefecture, has reached the end of service and has been sold for scrap, or exported. New vehicles are not delivered to the purchaser until the plates have been attached at the dealership. 

Since November 1, 1970, a "jikō-shiki" (字光式) plate has been offered for private vehicles at the owner's request. The green characters on this type of plate are replaced with molded green plastic that can be illuminated from behind the plate. From May 19, 1998, specific numbers can also be requested if the numbers are not already in use. From 2010, these are also available in blue version of vehicle registration plates started in 1973.

The international vehicle registration code for Japan is J.

Appearance

* These plates are issued by municipal governments.

 Large
 44x22 cm (17.3x8.7 inch)
 (for over 8 tons vehicle, or capacity of 30 people or more)
 Medium
 33x16.5 cm (13x6.5 inch)
 Small
 23x12.5 cm (9x4.9 inch)
 Extra small
 about 20x10 cm (7.8x3.9 inch)
 (differs according to each municipality)

Until 31 December 1974, kei cars had small green and white license plates. After this date, they received medium plates, now in black and yellow to distinguish them from regular cars.

Please note that, to avoid any claims of invasion of privacy, the artist of these pictures has deliberately selected an invalid combination of characters.

The illustration shows what a plate might look like. The top line contains the name of the issuing office (Tama, shown, is in Tokyo) and a vehicle class code. The bottom line contains a hiragana character and a four-digit serial number divided into two groups of two digits separated by a hyphen. Any leading zeroes are replaced by centered dots.

White plates can have the following hiragana (bold indicates rental vehicle characters):

さすせそたちつてとなにぬねのはひふほまみむめもやゆよらりるろれわGreen plates can have the following hiragana:

あいうえかきくけこを

Some characters, including ones with a dakuten or a handakuten,  be used on any plates, including the yellow and black ones:

'ばだがぱざびぢぎぴじぶづぐぷずべでげペぜぼどごぽぞゑゐ

A license plate in Japan thus follows this format: KK?*H##-## (e.g., 足立500き21-41), where KK is the name of the issuing office in kanji, H is a hiragana, ? is a 5 for vehicles less than 2000 cc and a 3 for vehicles greater than 2000 cc (other numbers are less common—1 for large trucks, 2 for buses, etc.), * is a number from 0 to 99 (pre-1971 license plates will omit this), and # is a number from 0* to 9 (*leading zeroes are replaced by centered dots).

Special use plates

Vehicles owned by personnel with the United States military in Japan under the Status of Forces Agreement (SOFA) have a "Y" on white plates, or an "A" on yellow plates, where the hiragana character is normally displayed. Earlier versions of the SOFA license plate displayed the letters "K", "M", "G", "H" and "E". These letters indicated the car was imported into Japan under SOFA and was left-hand drive. Today, cars with an "E" indicate that Japanese sales tax has not been paid and the vehicle will not remain in Japan when the military member departs. Since the 1980s, military commands have discouraged servicemembers assigned to Japan from shipping their vehicles from the U.S. into the country, so this is rarely seen. Military members who retire in Japan use the hiragana "よ". Many opt to purchase second-hand domestic vehicles through used car dealers off-base, and from other servicemembers departing Japan at on-base "lemon lots".

Out of country plates

Because the Japanese writing system, particularly the kana, is unique to Japan, standard-issue Japanese license plates are considered unacceptable for international travel. If motorists wish to take their vehicles abroad with them, the Ministry of Transport will issue them with plates with the hiragana and kanji scripts replaced by Roman letters. The hiragana prefix is replaced by a Kunrei-shiki romanization of that character. The kanji prefecture/office code is replaced by a two- or three-letter abbreviation, the first two letters representing the prefecture, the third (if present) representing the office within the prefecture. All the numerical portions of the plate remain the same.

Using the example given above, the plate (足立50Kき21-41) would then read TKA 50K KI 21-41 (TKA for Tokyo Adachi).

Vehicle class code system 

In addition to plate size and color, Japanese plates since 1962 have identified the vehicle type (signified by length, width and height as well as engine displacement) by use of a vehicle class code signified by a number on the top line of the plate for all vehicles with three or more wheels. 
The vehicle class code system is not widely understood outside of Japan, and as a result, Japanese vehicles displaying "vanity" Japanese license plates at overseas shows and events are often unwittingly misrepresented. 

Motorbikes and other two wheeled vehicles do not use this system. 

In 1967, double digit vehicle codes were introduced for the first time, once all previous possible combinations were used. For example, 3 would become 33, and then 34, 35, etc. This began in October 1967 in the more populous prefectures initially for the most common vehicle classes such as 3 and 5. In April 1971 all vehicle codes become double digit across the country. Double digit codes finally stopped being issued in 1999.

By the early 1970s, three wheeled passenger cars were no longer in production and some prefectures began to issue the double digit codes 77, 78 and 79 as an 'overflow series' for passenger cars 2000cc and under. This practice stopped in 1999.

By May 1998, some prefectures were beginning to run out of all possible combinations of double digit vehicle codes for the most common classes (notably 5 and 7) and began issuing triple digit vehicle codes.

Transportation offices and markings
In 2006, several new location names, known as  numbers, were approved by the MLIT for places that wanted to increase their recognition for purposes such as tourism. Criteria included the need for 100,000 vehicles in the area and the avoidance of an imbalance in the prefecture. The new locations began appearing in 2006 on plates for vehicles registered in certain specific cities, towns and villages in or near the places marked below in green.

See also
Keicar
Motor-vehicle inspection (Japan)

References

External links 
Japanese Government Ministry of Land, Infrastructure and Transport (English page) 

Japan
Transport in Japan
Japan transport-related lists
 Registration plates